Joan Airoldi is the former director of the Whatcom County Library System in Washington state.

Resisted targeting of library patron under the Patriot Act
In June 2004, with the support of staff from the Deming Library, a branch of the Whatcom County Library System, she refused to provide information requested by a visiting FBI agent regarding a patron's use of a book on Osama bin Laden.  The library system informed the FBI that no information would be released without a subpoena or court order.  She also led the library board to vote to fight any such subpoena in court.  When that grand jury subpoena was eventually issued, the library prepared to challenge it in court, and the subpoena was quickly withdrawn. At the time, Airoldi made this statement: "Libraries are a haven where people should be able to seek whatever information they want to pursue without any threat of government intervention."

Awards
Airoldi received the 2005 PEN/Newman's Own First Amendment Award in recognition of this act.  The Deming Library staff were similarly recognized, receiving a Human Rights Award in 2005 from the Whatcom County Human Rights Task Force.

Notes

External links
USA Today editorial by Joan Airoldi

American librarians
Living people
American librarianship and human rights
Year of birth missing (living people)
People from Whatcom County, Washington
American women librarians
Place of birth missing (living people)
21st-century American women